The 2007–08 All-Ireland Senior Club Hurling Championship was the 38th club hurling competition since its establishment in 1970–71. The first matches of the season were played on 14 October 2007 and the championship ended on 17 March 2008. Ballyhale Shamrocks went into the 2007–08 championship as defending champions, having won their fourth All-Ireland title the previous year.

The championship culminated with the All-Ireland final, held at Croke Park, Dublin. The match was contested by Birr and Portumna.  It was their first meeting in the final.  Portumna won the game by 3–19 to 3–9.  It was their second All-Ireland title in three years.

Format
The 2007–08 club championship was played on a straight knock-out basis.  Each of the eighteen participating counties entered their respective club champions.  The format of the competition was as follows:

A total of 18 county club champions participated in the 2008–09 championship:
Leinster: Carlow, Dublin, Kilkenny, Laois, Offaly, Wexford.
Munster: Clare, Cork, Kerry, Limerick, Tipperary, Waterford.
Connacht: Galway, Mayo, Roscommon
Ulster: Antrim, Derry, Down.

Provincial championships
The Connacht, Leinster, Munster and Ulster championships were played as usual on a straight knock-out basis. The four respective champions from these provinces advanced directly to the All-Ireland semi-finals.

All-Ireland Series
In the two semi-final matches, the Munster champions played the Connacht champions while the Leinster champions played the Ulster champions.  The two winners contested the All-Ireland final.

Participating clubs

Fixtures

Connacht Senior Club Hurling Championship

Quarter-finals

Semi-finals

Final

Leinster Senior Club Hurling Championship

Ulster Senior Club Hurling Championship

Munster Senior Club Hurling Championship

All-Ireland Senior Club Hurling Championship

MATCH RULES
60 minutes
Replay if scores level

Championship statistics

Scoring
Widest winning margin: 34 points
Portumna 6–23 : 0–7 James Stephens (Connacht final)
Most goals in a match: 6
Portumna 6–23 : 0–7 James Stephens (Connacht final)
Tulla 4–16 : 2–6 Lixnaw (Munster quarter-final)
Portumna 3–19 : 3–9 Birr (Connacht final)
Most points in a match: 40 
De La Salle 1–21 : 1–19 Ruairí Óg, Cushendall (All-Ireland semi-final)
Most points in a match: 32 
Ballyboden St. Enda's 1–17 : 0–15 Oulart the Ballagh (Leinster quarter-final)
Most goals by one team in a match: 6
Portumna 6–23 : 0–7 James Stephens (Connacht final)
Most points by one team in a match: 23
Portumna 6–23 : 0–7 James Stephens (Connacht final)

Top scorers

Season

Single game

Referees
The following referees were used during the championship:

2007 in hurling
2008 in hurling
All-Ireland Senior Club Hurling Championship